Central Procurement Technical Unit is a Bangladesh government agency under the Ministry of Planning responsible for managing procurement by government bodies. Md. Ali Noor is the Director General of Central Procurement Technical Unit.

History
Central Procurement Technical Unit was established in April 2002 by the government of Bangladesh. It was placed under the Implementation Monitoring and Evaluation Division of the Ministry of Planning.

References

2002 establishments in Bangladesh
Organisations based in Dhaka
Government agencies of Bangladesh